Lambuh Knoll (‘Lambuhska Mogila’ \'lam-buh-ska mo-'gi-la\) is the ice-covered hill rising to 924 m at the north entrance to Trajan Gate between Louis-Philippe Plateau and Srednogorie Heights on Trinity Peninsula in Graham Land, Antarctica. It is surmounting Malorad Glacier to the northwest.

The hill is named after the settlement of Lambuh in Southern Bulgaria.

Location
German-British mapping in 1996.

Maps
 Trinity Peninsula. Scale 1:250000 topographic map No. 5697. Institut für Angewandte Geodäsie and British Antarctic Survey, 1996.
 Antarctic Digital Database (ADD). Scale 1:250000 topographic map of Antarctica. Scientific Committee on Antarctic Research (SCAR), 1993–2016.

Notes

References
 Lambuh Knoll. SCAR Composite Antarctic Gazetteer
 Bulgarian Antarctic Gazetteer. Antarctic Place-names Commission. (details in Bulgarian, basic data in English)

External links
 Lambuh Knoll. Copernix satellite image

Hills of Trinity Peninsula
Bulgaria and the Antarctic